Arctic Valley Ski Area, formerly known as Alpenglow at Arctic Valley, is a ski area in Anchorage, Alaska. It is located on Ski Bowl Road in Chugach State Park, in the upper Ship Creek valley adjacent to Joint Base Elmendorf-Richardson. Its main competitor is Alyeska Resort.

Arctic Valley has three chair lifts, one rope tow, a tubing lift, and four bowls. The ski area is operated by the Anchorage Ski Club under a concession agreement with Chugach State Park.

Arctic Valley is open for skiing and riding on weekends only until spring, when Thursdays and Fridays are added to the schedule. Tubing is open Thursday-Sunday from Thanksgiving weekend to the first weekend in April.

History

The Anchorage Ski Club was founded in 1937 by Al Corey and Ralph Soberg. It has provided skiing at Arctic Valley since the 1940s. The Army used to operate an adjacent ski area just south of the current facilities, which was removed in the early 2000s. The Anchorage Ski Club also has an area use permit for additional neighboring acreage in Chugach State Park. 

Arctic Valley is considered an economical and "grass roots" alternative to skiing which typically attracted locals and committed recreational skiers.

Arctic Valley is the only multiple chair ski area located within  of Anchorage.

In 2012, Arctic Valley opened a tubing park serviced by a pony tow lift. This is the only tubing park open to the general public in southcentral Alaska.

External links
 

1940s establishments in Alaska
Roadside attractions in Alaska
Ski areas and resorts in Alaska
Sports venues in Anchorage, Alaska